Teratoscincus sistanense is a small species of gecko, a lizard in the family Sphaerodactylidae. The species is endemic to Iran.

Geographic range
T. sistanense is found in Sistan and Baluchestan Province in southeastern Iran.

Habitat
The preferred habitat of T. sistanensis is a hot and dry climate, with flat sandy soil interspersed with patches of gravel or loamy-silty soil, and sparse vegetation mainly of the genus Tamarix.

Description
T. sistanense has 145-165 scales around the body at midbody, the most of any species in its genus. The first upper labial does not form part of the margin of the nostril.

Behavior
T. sistanense is nocturnal.

References

Further reading
Akbarpour, Morteza; Shafiei, Soheila; Sehhatisabet, Mohammad Ebrahim; Damadi, Ehsan (2017). "A new species of frog-eyed gecko, genus Teratoscincus Strauch, 1863 (Squamata: Sphaerodactylidae), from southeastern Iran". Zoology in the Middle East 63 (4): 296–302. (Teratoscincus sistanense, new species). 

Teratoscincus
Endemic fauna of Iran
Reptiles of Iran
Reptiles described in 2017